Mainstream was a science fiction fanzine edited by Jerry Kaufman and Suzanne Tompkins. The magazine was started in 1978 and headquartered in Seattle. It was nominated for the 1991 Hugo Award for Best Fanzine, losing to Lan's Lantern. Mainstream ceased publication in December 1998 with #17.

References

1978 establishments in Washington (state)
1998 disestablishments in Washington (state)
Defunct science fiction magazines published in the United States
Magazines established in 1978
Magazines disestablished in 1998
Magazines published in Seattle
Science fiction fanzines